Bima Perkasa Jogja is a basketball club based in Yogyakarta, Indonesia. Originally, it was founded at 6 June 1988 in Malang, East Java under the name Bima Sakti Malang, and began their debut in the Perbasi's highest division since 1991/1992. 

In 1995, Bima Sakti basketball club is sponsored by PT Nikko Steel and change it name to Bima Sakti Nikko Steel Malang till 2016. Their highest achievement is advanced the 1995 and 1996 semifinals and get the third place.

Roster

Rookie Binaan
Jacpb Lobbu

External links
 IBL profile
 NBL profile

Basketball teams in Indonesia
Sport in East Java
1988 establishments in Indonesia
Basketball teams established in 1988
Sport in Yogyakarta